Airlake Airport  is a public use airport in Dakota County, Minnesota, United States.

This facility is included in the National Plan of Integrated Airport Systems for 2017–2021, which categorized it as a general aviation reliever airport.

Although many U.S. airports use the same three-letter location identifier for the FAA and IATA, this airport is assigned LVN by the FAA but has no designation from the IATA.

Facilities and aircraft 
Airlake Airport covers an area of 425 acres (172 ha) at an elevation of 960 feet (293 m) above mean sea level. It has one runway designated 12/30 with an asphalt surface measuring 4,099 by 75 feet (1,249 x 23 m).

There is one fixed-base operator (FBO), Aircraft Resource Center.

For the 12-month period ending December 31, 2014, the airport had 34,174 aircraft operations, an average of 94 per day, 95% general aviation, 4% air taxi and 1% military. In January 2017, there were 108 aircraft based at this airport: 99 single-engine and 9 multi-engine.

References

External links 
 Airlake Airport at Metropolitan Airports Commission
   at Minnesota DOT airport directory
 Aircraft Resource Center, the fixed-base operator (FBO)
 Aerial image as of April 1991 from USGS The National Map
 

Airports in Minnesota
Buildings and structures in Dakota County, Minnesota
Transportation in Dakota County, Minnesota